Provincial Road 275 (PR 275), known locally as Ditch Road, is a provincial road in the Canadian province of Manitoba. It is paved for its entire length.

Route description 
Provincial Road 275 serves rural areas west of the town of Swan River. It begins at the Manitoba-Saskatchewan border and intersects with PR 588, about halfway to Swan River. Upon entering Swan River, the highway curves sharply and terminates at PTH 10A, the town's north bypass. Although the highway is extremely straight, it does cross some hilly terrain and offers views of the Swan River Valley.

See also 
Saskatchewan Highway 753

275